Corman is a surname. Notable people with the surname include:

Avery Corman (born 1935), American novelist
Cid Corman (1924–2004), American poet
Doyle Corman (1932–2019), American politician
Jake Corman (born 1964), American Republican politician
James C. Corman (1920–2000), American Democratic politician
Maddie Corman (born 1970), American TV and film actress
Richard Corman (photographer) (born 1954), American photographer
Richard J. Corman (1955–2013), American businessman
Robert De Cormier (1922–2017), also known as Bob Corman, American musician
Roger Corman (born 1926), American film producer and director
Sandrine Corman (born 1980), Miss Belgium 1997
Mathias Cormann (born 1970), Australian politician

Fictional characters:
Kimberly Corman, character from the film Final Destination 2
Harvey Corman, character from the sitcom Scrubs